The 2019 Middlesbrough Council election took place on 2 May 2019 to elect members of Middlesbrough Council in England.

Summary

Election result

|-

Ward results

Acklam

Ayresome

Berwick Hills & Pallister

Brambles & Thorntree

Central

Coulby Newham

Hemlington

Kader

Ladgate

Linthorpe

Longlands & Beechwood

Marton East

Marton West

Newport

North Ormesby

Nunthorpe

Park End & Beckfield

Park

Stainton & Thornton

Trimdon

By-elections

Ladgate

North Ormesby

References

2019 English local elections
May 2019 events in the United Kingdom
2019
21st century in Tyne and Wear